(February 2, 1882 – January 9, 1971) was a Japanese painter who was active from the Meiji era to the Showa era, mainly in public exhibitions. He studied under Kawai Gyokudo and was particularly adept at bird and flower painting.

Early life
Shodo Hirata was born in 1882 in Ushigome, Tokyo. He was the second son of Count Hirata Tosuke, who was a Japanese statesman and Lord Keeper of the Privy Seal of Japan, active during the Meiji and Taishō periods of the Empire of Japan.

Career
After studying under Kawai Gyokudo, he entered the Tokyo Academy of Fine Arts in 1901 and graduated in 1906. 

Hirata Shodo participated in the very first art exhibition organized by the Japan Art Academy, called BUNTEN, in 1907. His painting Yuku Aki was selected for recognition and his works were equally favoured at future BUNTEN exhibitions.

In 1921, he became a professor at the Tokyo Academy of Fine Arts. He also served as a judge at the 7th Imperial Exhibition in 1926. He was the chairman of the Dai-nippon Drawing and Handicraft Association, and a member of the Ministry of Education, Culture, Sports, Science and Technology's Drawing Textbook Compilation committee.

Notable works
 Autumn (1907)
 Autumn Colors (1910)
 Autumn in the Trees (1912)
 The Voice of a Small Bird (1914)
 Matsukanno Haru (Spring Between the Pine) (1915)

Hirata family tree

References

External links 
 平田松堂
 玉堂美術館ホームページ

1882 births
1971 deaths
Nihonga painters
People from Tokyo
20th-century Japanese painters
Imperial household artists
Members of the Japan Art Academy
People of the Empire of Japan
Persons of Cultural Merit